Magnetic potential may refer to:

 Magnetic vector potential, the vector whose curl is equal to the magnetic B field
 Magnetic scalar potential, the magnetic analogue of electric potential